A Chinese candy box is a traditional box used during Chinese New Year for storing candy and other edible goods. The box usually has a lid; some are more fancy and elaborate than others. It is usually colored with a red or black motif, since traditional candy boxes were lacquerware. Also red symbolizes good fortune and joy (see Color in Chinese culture). Due to the higher price of lacquerware, most modern Chinese candy boxes are made of plastic, but some of them are still made of lacquerware.

Occasions
The box is generally used for Chinese New Year, though some regional Chinese cultures may use it for other important events such as Chinese marriages. Usually it consists of 8 or 6 (Chinese auspicious lucky numbers) kinds of sugar preserved dried fruits or even dried vegetables like the bittergourd.

Items stored
 Chocolate coins
 Dried candied lotus root
 Dried candied lotus seed
 Melon seed
 Dried candied kumquat
 Dried candied pineapple
 Dried candied coconut
 Dried candied carrot slices
 Dried candied ginger
 Dried candied water chestnut
 Dried candied winter melon táng dōng guā (lit. candied winter melon)
 Dried peanuts

See also
 Lacquerware
 Red envelope
 Traditional candies in Hong Kong

Chinese lacquerware